Maria Carlos Martins dos Santos (born December 18, 1978) is a retired female backstroke and medley swimmer from Portugal, who competed for her native country at the 1996 Olympic Games in Atlanta, Georgia.

External links
 sports-reference

1978 births
Living people
Portuguese female swimmers
Female backstroke swimmers
Female medley swimmers
Swimmers at the 1996 Summer Olympics
Olympic swimmers of Portugal